1,2,3-Tribromopropane (TBP) is a toxic organic compound.  It is a clear colorless to light yellow liquid.

References

Bromoalkanes